The 1894 New South Wales tour of New Zealand was a rugby union tour of New Zealand undertaken by the New South Wales (NSW) representative side. During the tour NSW played matches against provincial New Zealand sides, and one against a representative New Zealand team.

New South Wales won four of the matches, including the inter-colonial match against New Zealand, and lost the other eight.

Summary 
The New South Wales team, known as "Cornstalks", played their twelve tour matches in only one month. They lost all their matches against North Island sides, but in the South Island lost only one matchagainst Canterbury. Their wins in the South Island included the only match against New Zealand, which was an 8–6 victory in Christchurch. Reflecting on the tour after returning to Australia, members of the team claimed that the wet weather they experienced in the North Island accounted for their poor results there, with the New Zealander's displaying much better ball handling skills in such weather.

Matches 

Scores and results list New South Wales' points tally first:

Touring party
The New South Wales Rugby Union selected 25 players to represent the colony on tour. However according to Sydney's Evening News although "the names of some really first-class players are included in the team it cannot be called a thoroughly representative one" due to the absence of a number of players. The team were:

 Alcock (Wallaroo)
 Barry (Orange)
 Brand (Armidale)
 Bliss (Armidale)
 Clayton (Orange)
 Cupples (Pirates)
 Carson (Orange)
 Cobb (Newcastle)
 Dibbs (Wallaroo)
 Edwards (Newcastle)
 Galloway (Randwick)
 Henlen (Randwick)
 Hanna (Paddington)

 Lane (Wallaroo)
 Lohan (Orange)
 Lusk (Pirates)
 McMahon (Randwick)
 Parish (Randwick)
 Ranken (Bathurst)
 Riley (Randwick)
 Surman (Randwick)
 Sawyer (University)
 Scott (Wallaroo)
 Walsh (Pirates)
 Wyburd (Bathurst)

References

New South Wales
Waratahs
New South Wales rugby union team tours
1894
Tour